Allium croaticum is a species of flowering plant in the genus Allium (onions) found only on the island of Vis in Croatia.

Reference

croaticum
Endemic flora of Croatia
Plants described in 2008